Gary Warren (born 5 July 1954) is an English former child actor, best remembered for his role as Peter in the 1970 film The Railway Children.

Retired actor Gary Warren was born in Neasden, London. As well as his film appearances, he played Cedric Collingford ("Owl Face") in series 2 of the 1971 TV series Catweazle appearing as the main 20th century contact of Catweazle. and Taplow (the troublemaking pupil) in Whacko, as well as starring as Alexander in his own TV sitcom Alexander the Greatest (1971). In the West End, he played the nephew of Mame in the musical Mame starring Ginger Rogers. He played Lambert Simnel in the 1972 BBC series The Shadow of the Tower.He was interviewed by Danny Baker on Radio London twice in 2010. He appeared on the Word In Your Attic YouTube show hosted by David Hepworth and Mark Ellen in 2020. Gary is a fanatical Queens Park Rangers supporter.

Filmography
1966  Disney Wonderland  (TV series)
1967 Z-Cars (TV series)
1967 The Ragged Trousered Philanthropists (TV movie)
1970 The Railway Children
1970–1971 Catweazle (TV series)
1972 The Shadow of the Tower (TV series)
1972 Whack-O! (TV series)
1971–1972 Alexander the Greatest (Title Role)

References

External links

1954 births
Living people
English male child actors
English male film actors
English male television actors
English male stage actors
20th-century English male actors
People from Cricklewood
Male actors from London